The 2021 Delaware Fightin' Blue Hens football team represented the University of Delaware as a member of the Colonial Athletic Association (CAA) during the 2021 NCAA Division I FCS football season. Led by Danny Rocco in his fifth and final season as head coach, the Fightin' Blue Hens compiled an overall record of 5–6 with a mark of 3–5 in conference play, tying for ninth place in the CAA. The team played home games at Delaware Stadium in Newark, Delaware. Rocco was fired at the end of the season.

Previous season

The Fightin' Blue Hens finished the regular season as champions of the CAA North Division and CAA overall, earning the conference's automatic bid to the FCS Playoffs.  Delaware lost in the FCS Semifinals to South Dakota State, finishing the shortened season 7–1.

Schedule

References

Delaware
Delaware Fightin' Blue Hens football seasons
Delaware Fightin' Blue Hens football